Liis Lepik (born 2 October 1994) is an Estonian footballer who plays as a defender and has appeared for the Estonia women's national team.

Career
Lepik has been capped for the Estonia national team, appearing for the team during the UEFA Women's Euro 2021 qualifying cycle.

References

External links
 
 
 
 
 

1994 births
Living people
Sportspeople from Kuressaare
Estonian women's footballers
Estonia women's international footballers
Women's association football defenders
FC Flora (women) players